SFER may refer to:
 The stock symbol of Salvatore Ferragamo
 The GPS station San Fernando in Iberian Peninsula